This article lists diplomatic missions resident in Lithuania. At present, the capital city of Vilnius hosts 35 embassies and one embassy branch office. Several other countries have ambassadors accredited to Lithuania, with most being resident in Berlin, Copenhagen, Moscow, Warsaw or other Nordic capitals.

Diplomatic missions in Vilnius

Non-resident embassies
Resident in Berlin, Germany:

 
 
 
 
 
 
 
 
 
 
 

Resident in Copenhagen, Denmark:

 
 
 
 
 
 
 
 
 
 

Resident in Helsinki, Finland:

 
 
 
 
 

Resident in Minsk, Belarus:

 
 
 
 
 

Resident in Moscow, Russia:

 
 
 
 
 

Resident in Riga, Latvia:

 
 
 
 
 

Resident in Stockholm, Sweden:

 
 
 
 
 
 
 
 
 
 
 
 

Resident in Warsaw, Poland:

Resident in other cities:

  (Andorra la Vella)
  (Vienna)
  (Paris)
  (Brussels)
  (Hague)
  (Brussels)
  (Valletta)
  (Vienna)
  (Kyiv)
  (London)
  (Hague)
  (San Marino)
  (Oslo)

Closed missions

See also
 Foreign relations of Lithuania
 List of diplomatic missions of Lithuania

Notes

References

External links
 Vilnius Diplomatic List

 
Lithuania
Diplomatic missions